Laculataria nigroapicata is a species of moth of the family Tortricidae. It is found in Morona-Santiago Province, Ecuador.

The wingspan is about 19 mm. The ground colour of the forewings is white, preserved as a blotch extending from beyond the base of the dorsum to the tornus and in the proximal area. The area to the tornus and apex is brownish cream, mixed with brown grey posteriorly. The base of the wing and a spot at the tornus are green with brown strigulae (fine streaks). The hindwings are white, suffused with pale brownish on the periphery.

Etymology
The species name refers to the black spot in the apical part of the forewing.

References

Moths described in 2006
Eucosmini